Oaks is an unincorporated community in southwestern Orange County, North Carolina, United States. It is located southwest of Teer.

The Bingham School was listed on the National Register of Historic Places in 1978.

References

Unincorporated communities in Orange County, North Carolina
Unincorporated communities in North Carolina